Manilkara maxima is a species of plant in the family Sapotaceae. It is endemic to Brazil, where it is threatened by habitat loss.

References

maxima
Plants described in 1990
Vulnerable plants
Endemic flora of Brazil
Taxonomy articles created by Polbot